Guaimbê is a municipality in the state of São Paulo in Brazil. It is located near the cities of Lins and Araçatuba. It was founded in 1953. The population is 5,785 (2020 est.) in an area of 218 km2. Its altitude is 469 m.

Guaimbê or guaibê is also a plant (Philodendron williamsii) which has a sweet fruit which was very much appreciated by the Guarani Indians. The location was probably named after the plant.

References

Municipalities in São Paulo (state)